"Don't Let Me Go" is a song by American power pop band The Click Five, released as the third single taken from their third studio album TCV. The song was written by bassist Ethan Mentzer. The song was performed during tours and shows in 2008 by Kyle and Ethan, with Ethan on guitar and Kyle singing. It is the last studio single released by the band before their breakup in 2013.

In the studio version, drums and backup vocals were added. The studio arrangement has yet to be performed in public.

Chart performance
"Don't Let Me Go" reached a peak of number 5 on the weekly Top 20 charts on Singapore radio station 987FM. It stayed on the chart for nine weeks.

At the end of the year 2011, it ranked number 55 in the best songs of 2011.

MTV EXIT
MTV EXIT picked up the song to help raise awareness about human trafficking. The band worked with MTV EXIT to produce a music video, which was released on April 15, 2011.

Music video
The music video begins with a close-up of lead singer Kyle Patrick, playing his guitar. The scene then switches to show several people living their lives normally, having fun and socializing, but wearing blindfolds. The blindfolds symbolize that people are not aware of what is happening around them, which is the case for human trafficking.

The band is then shown blindfolded playing their instruments as Patrick's vocals come in. More scenes of people wearing blindfolds appear. The scene switches to a girl, a victim of human trafficking, crying. A caption on the screen reads, "AT ANY ONE POINT 2.5 MILLION VICTIMS ARE TRAFFICKED WORLDWIDE". A still of a girl holding a teddy bear is shown, the girl crying for help and the mother reaching out for her daughter. The girl is being snatched from her family to be sold to the multi-million industry of human trafficking.

Three more captions are shown: "1.2 MILLION CHILDREN ARE TRAFFICKED EACH YEAR" & "30% OF FEMALE VICTIMS ARE FORCED INTO LABOR." A photo of a group of females doing manual labor appears. Another shows a man holding a woman, wearing a "FOR SALE" sign.

Then, "70% OF FEMALE VICTIMS ARE TRAFFICKED INTO THE COMMERCIAL SEX INDUSTRY." The video switches to show a female being abused by a handler.

Next: "ANNUAL REVENUE GENERATED BY TRAFFICKING IS OVER $32 BILLION".

Finally, after displaying "CHANCES ARE IT'S HAPPENING RIGHT IN FRONT OF YOU", the band members start to take off their blindfolds, along with the others in the video. This symbolizes people becoming aware of human trafficking. More scenes of victims are shown. The members of the band are shown listening to survivors sharing their stories.

At the end, lead singer Kyle Patrick reaches out to the camera and shuts it off.

References

The Click Five songs
2010 songs
2010 singles
Rock ballads